The Autostrada A17 was an Italian motorway that used to connect Naples to Bari. The section from Naples to Canosa was later renamed Autostrada A16, while the section connecting Canosa to Bari was integrated into Autostrada A14.

The reasoning behind the renaming of the Naples to Canosa section is unclear, however an urban legend was formed in which, due to the high accident rate of the section, it was renamed to dispel the bad fortune brought on by the number 17, which signifies bad luck in Italy. After being decommissioned, A17 was never used for any other Italian motorway.

References

Buildings and structures completed in 1969
Autostrade in Italy
Transport in Campania
Transport in Apulia